Kaio Silva Mendes (born 18 March 1995), simply known as Kaio, is a Brazilian footballer who plays as a midfielder for Ituano.

Career
Born in Várzea Grande, Kaio began his career with Grêmio Foot-Ball Porto Alegrense. He made two appearances as an unused substitute in the 2015 Campeonato Brasileiro Série A season, the first being a 2–0 win at Figueirense FC on 4 September.

The following 10 February, he made his professional debut in a 1–0 win at Veranópolis Esporte Clube Recreativo e Cultural in the 2016 Campeonato Gaúcho, as a half-time replacement for Moisés.

On 31 January 2019, Kaio was loaned out to Sport Club do Recife until the end of the year.

Honours
Grêmio
Copa do Brasil: 2016
Copa Libertadores: 2017
Recopa Sudamericana: 2018
Campeonato Gaúcho 2018

References

External links

1995 births
Living people
People from Várzea Grande, Mato Grosso
Sportspeople from Mato Grosso
Brazilian footballers
Association football midfielders
Campeonato Brasileiro Série A players
Grêmio Foot-Ball Porto Alegrense players
Sport Club do Recife players